Arthur H. Treutel was a member of the Wisconsin State Assembly.

Biography
Treutel was born on May 21, 1897, in Wausau, Wisconsin. He later resided in Wisconsin Rapids, Wisconsin.

Career
Treutel was elected to the Assembly in 1958. Additionally, he was Chairman of the Wood County, Wisconsin Democratic Party from 1954 to 1956 and a delegate to the Democratic National Convention in 1952 and 1956.

References

Politicians from Wausau, Wisconsin
People from Wisconsin Rapids, Wisconsin
Democratic Party members of the Wisconsin State Assembly
1897 births
Year of death missing